Fag may refer to: 
 FAG, a brand of the Schaeffler Group
 Cigarette, in British slang
 Fagging, in British public schools
 Faggot (slang) or fag, a pejorative term for a homosexual
 FAGS (candy), now FADS, an Australian candy
 Fagurhólsmýri Airport, in Iceland by IATA code
 Federação Anarquista Gaúcha, a Brazilian anarchist organization
 Feminist Art Gallery, in Toronto, Ontario, Canada
 Finongan language, spoken in Papua New Guinea (ISO 639 code)
 Fluorescein angiography
 Frisch Auf Göppingen, a German sport club
 Fuerzas Armadas Guanches, a terrorist group in the Canary Islands
 Guatemalan Air Force

See also
 Fagg (disambiguation)
 Faggot (disambiguation)
 Fagot (disambiguation)